Rasmus Nielsen (born February 28, 1983) is a professional squash player who has represented Denmark.

Nielsen was born in Sønderborg. He reached a career-high world ranking of World No. 75 in March 2013.

References

External links 
 
 

Danish male squash players
Living people
1983 births
People from Sønderborg Municipality
Sportspeople from the Region of Southern Denmark